Bruno Gudelj (born 8 May 1966) is a Croatian handball player.

He played for the Croatia men's national handball team at the 1996 Summer Olympics in Atlanta, where Croatia won the gold medal.

Honours
Zagreb
Yugoslav First League (2): 1988-89, 1990-91
Yugoslav Second League (2): 1984-85, 1987-88
Croatian First League (4): 1991-92, 1992-93, 1993-94, 2004-05
Croatian Cup (3): 1992, 1993, 1994, 2005
EHF Champions League (2): 1991-92, 1992-93
European Super Cup (1): 1993

Bregenz Handball
Austria Liga (2): 2000-01, 2001-02
Austria Cup (3): 2000, 2002, 2003

Orders
Order of Danica Hrvatska with face of Franjo Bučar - 1995

References

External links
 
 
 
 

1966 births
Living people
Croatian male handball players
Croatian handball coaches
Olympic handball players of Croatia
Olympic gold medalists for Croatia
Olympic medalists in handball
Handball players at the 1996 Summer Olympics
Medalists at the 1996 Summer Olympics
Mediterranean Games gold medalists for Croatia
Mediterranean Games medalists in handball
Competitors at the 1993 Mediterranean Games
Goodwill Games medalists in handball
RK Zagreb players
Competitors at the 1990 Goodwill Games